The 1975 Düsseldorf Grand Prix, also known by its sponsored name Agfa Colour Cup, was a men's Grand Prix tennis circuit tournament held in Düsseldorf, West Germany and played on outdoor clay courts. It was the sixth edition of the tournament and was held from 26 May though 1 June 1975. Second-seeded Jaime Fillol won the singles title.

Finals

Singles
 Jaime Fillol defeated  Jan Kodeš 6–4, 1–6, 6–0, 7–5

Doubles
 François Jauffret /  Jan Kodeš defeated  Harald Elschenbroich /  Hans Kary 6–2, 6–3

References

Düsseldorf Grand Prix
1975 in West German sport